Character development may refer to:
 Characterization, how characters are represented and given detail in a narrative.
 Character arc, the change in characterization of a dynamic character over the course of a narrative.
 Character creation, especially for games
 Experience point (character advancement), increase in scores and other changes of a game character; for example, in role-playing video games
 Moral character, a term used in many educational systems to indicate a strategy for the maturation of individual students